Natta Nachan (born 6 April 1990) is a Thai athlete specialising in the javelin throw. She won a bronze medal at the 2019 Asian Championships. Additionally, she won several medals at the Southeast Asian Games.

Her personal best in the event is 56.01 metres set in Doha in 2019.

International competitions

References

1990 births
Living people
Natta Nachan
Athletes (track and field) at the 2010 Asian Games
Athletes (track and field) at the 2014 Asian Games
Athletes (track and field) at the 2018 Asian Games
Natta Nachan
Natta Nachan
Natta Nachan